Burgoyne Bay Provincial Park is a provincial park in British Columbia, Canada located on southwestern Saltspring Island near Fulford Harbour and facing northwest to Sansum Narrows, which is the channel between Saltspring and Vancouver Island. Mount Maxwell Provincial Park lies adjacent, to the north. Burgoyne Bay was named in 1859 by Captain Richards for Commander Hugh Talbot Burgoyne VC, an officer aboard HMS Ganges.

References

Provincial parks of British Columbia
Salt Spring Island
Protected areas established in 2004
2004 establishments in British Columbia